Stemmler or Stemler is a surname of German origin. It may refer to:

Antonie Stemmler (1892–1976), German teacher, nurse and member of the fascist resistance
Gust Stemmler (1899–1986), American politician
Mark Stemmler (born 1960), American scientist
Michael Erin Stemmler (born 1987), American citizen born in Detroit. 
Otto Adolph Stemler (1872–1953), American painter and illustrator
Steven R. Stemler (born 1960), American politician

German-language surnames
Surnames from nicknames